The men's decathlon competition at the 1998 Asian Games in Bangkok, Thailand was held on 17 and 18 December at the Thammasat Stadium.

Schedule
All times are Indochina Time (UTC+07:00)

Results

Legend
DNF — Did not finish
DNS — Did not start
NM — No mark

100 metres

Long jump

Shot put

High jump

400 metres

110 metres hurdles

Discus throw

Pole vault

Javelin throw

1500 metres

Summary

References

External links
Results

Men's decathlon
1998